United Nations Security Council Resolution 1890 was unanimously adopted on 8 October 2009.

Resolution 
Expressing its strong concern over the increase in violence and criminality in Afghanistan, the Security Council today extended the authorization for the International Security Assistance Force (ISAF) for 12 months beyond 13 October 2009.

As its members unanimously adopted resolution 1890 (2009), the Council also called on Member States to contribute personnel, equipment and other resources in order to allow ISAF to meet security and assistance challenges.  It stressed the importance of strengthening the Afghan security sector so as to allow it to establish the rule of law throughout the country, encouraging ISAF and other partners to support the planned expansion of the Afghan National Army and the Afghan National Police.

See also 
List of United Nations Security Council Resolutions 1801 to 1900 (2008–2009)

References

External links
 
Text of the Resolution at undocs.org

 1890
 1890
October 2009 events
2009 in Afghanistan